Pundit Ganga Prasad Upadhyaya (1871-1968) was an Arya Samaji writer. He served as professor of Meerut College at Allahabad University and as chief judge at Tehri, Garhwal District, from which post he retired to serve the Arya Samaj full-time.
. He was the father of Swami Satya Prakash Saraswati, another notable Arya Samaji author and Vishwa Prakash, Shree Prakash and Ravi Prakash. 

Upadhyaya is notable for producing anti-Christian tracts in the context of the Indian independence struggle under the British Raj and the formative years of the 1947 Republic of India; these include "The Arya Samaj and Christianity" (Allahabad, 1941, 1965) and "Christianity in India" (1956).
In The Fountainhead of Religion, he postulates a "common origin from the Vedas" for all world religions.

Bibliography
1911, The Fountainhead of Religion: A Comparative Study of the Principal Religions of the World and a Manifestation of Their Common Origin from the Vedas
1916, Problems of the Universe
1930, The Arya Samaj & Hinduism
1930, Vedic Womanhood
1930, Vedic View of Life
1933, Arya Samaj & Islam
1934, Inner Man & Other Lectures on Arya Philosophy
1939, I and My God
1939, Swami Dayanand's contribution to Hindu solidarity
1940, The origin, scope and mission of the Arya Samaj
1940, Pamphlets on the Arya Samaj
1941, The Arya Samaj and Christianity, extended editions 1956, 1965
1947, Landmarks of Svami Dayanand's Teachings
1950, A catechism of the elementary teachings of Hinduism
1953, The Caste System: Its Origin and Growth; Its Social Evils and Their Remedies
1955, Philosophy of Dayananda
1956, Social reconstruction by Buddha and Dayananda
1957, Reason & Religion
1962, Vedic culture

References

External links
 

Arya Samajis
1881 births
1968 deaths